Serkan Özbalta (born 5 February 1979) is a Turkish football manager and former player. He is the manager of Sakaryaspor.

Career
A youth product of Gençlerbirliği, Özbalta began his senior career with Erzincanspor in 1998, and transferred to Altay in 1999. He went on loan to Mersin İY, Keskinspor, and Seyhan Belediyespor to start his career. He spent the rest of his career in various pro and semi-pro teams in the second and third divisions of Turkey.

After retiring as a player, Özbalta began managing with Ankara Keçiörengücü in the TFF Second League, and in his debut season got them promoted to the TFF First League without losing a match at home. He moved to Manisa in the Second League in 2020, and again promoted the team to the TFF First League with an undefeated title and goal records. On 27 January 2022, he signed as the manager for his former club Altay in the Turkish Süper Lig.

On 10 October 2022, Özbalta was hired by Sakaryaspor in the TFF First League.

Honours
Ankara Keçiörengücü
 TFF Second League: 2018–19

Manisa FK
 TFF Second League: 2020–21

References

External links
 
 
 Manager Profile
 Soccerway Manager profile

1979 births
Living people
People from Of, Turkey
Turkish footballers
Turkish football managers
Erzincanspor footballers
Altay S.K. footballers
Mersin İdman Yurdu footballers
Gümüşhanespor footballers
Kayseri Erciyesspor footballers
24 Erzincanspor footballers
Maltepespor footballers
Giresunspor footballers
Kahramanmaraşspor footballers
Ofspor footballers
TFF First League players
TFF Second League players
TFF Third League players
Altay S.K. managers
Hatayspor managers
Sakaryaspor managers
Süper Lig managers
Association football midfielders